Ariake (有明: "daybreak") may refer to:

Places in Japan
Ariake, Kagoshima, a former town in Kagoshima Prefecture
Ariake, Kumamoto, a former town in Kumamoto Prefecture
Ariake, Saga, a former town in Saga Prefecture
Ariake, Tokyo, a district within Kōtō, Tokyo
Ariake Sea, a body of water surrounded by Fukuoka, Saga, Nagasaki, and Kumamoto Prefectures

People with the surname
Kambara Ariake (1876–1952), Japanese poet and novelist

Other
Ariake (train), a train service of Kyushu Railway Company
 , four destroyers of the Imperial Japanese Navy and the Japanese Maritime Self-Defense Force
 Ariake (ferry), a ferry shipwrecked in 2009
 , a Japanese World War II ship torpedoed and sunk in February 1944
 Ariake (food processing manufacturer), a Japanese food processing manufacturer